The Monument to Álvaro de Bazán is an instance of public art in Madrid, Spain. Located at the Plaza de la Villa, it consists of a bronze sculpture designed by Mariano Benlliure representing Álvaro de Bazán—a noted 16th century Admiral of the Spanish Navy once described by Cervantes as "father of soldiers, lightning of war, fortunate and never defeated captain"— put on top of a stone pedestal.

History and description
The project was awarded to Mariano Benlliure. The statue was cast in bronze in Rome at Crescenzi's foundry.

The standing full-body figure of the Álvaro de Bazán lies on top of the pedestal as the leading element of the sculptural ensemble. He is depicted wearing armor, while grabbing the handle of his sword with his left hand and wielding a staff of command with his right hand. Lying below the Admiral and also cast in bronze, the ensemble features a laureate helmet and a shattered Turkish banner on which the Marquis of Santa Cruz steps.

Originally, the stone pedestal reportedly displayed four dolphins cast in bronze at the corners of its lower part, and, placed within a bronze palm leaf wreath at its front side an inscription in bronze reading: . However, over the years, the pedestal would lose these secondary bronze items. The backside of the pedestal displays an inscription with a quote from some verses dedicated to Álvaro de Bazán by Lope de Vega:

It was officially unveiled on 19 December 1891, at its location in the Plaza de la Villa, during a ceremony presided by queen regent Maria Christina of Habsburg-Lorraine. The inauguration was also attended by the Infanta Isabella, Prime Minister Antonio Cánovas del Castillo, a number of additional government ministers, several generals and members of the councils of the Ayuntamiento and the Provincial Deputation, among others.

References
Citations

Bibliography
 
 
 
 

Monuments and memorials in Madrid
Buildings and structures in Palacio neighborhood, Madrid
Bronze sculptures in Spain
Sculptures by Mariano Benlliure
Sculptures of men in Spain
Statues of military officers
Outdoor sculptures in Madrid